In enzymology, a cysteine desulfurase is an enzyme that catalyzes the chemical reaction

L-cysteine + [enzyme]-cysteine  L-alanine + [enzyme]-S-sulfanylcysteine

Thus, the two substrates of this enzyme are L-cysteine and [enzyme]-cysteine], whereas its two products are L-alanine and [enzyme]-S-sulfanylcysteine.

This enzyme belongs to the family of transferases, specifically the sulfurtransferases, which transfer sulfur-containing groups.  The systematic name of this enzyme class is L-cysteine:[enzyme cysteine] sulfurtransferase. Other names in common use include IscS, NIFS, NifS, SufS, and cysteine desulfurylase.  This enzyme participates in thiamine metabolism.

Structural studies

As of late 2007, only one structure has been solved for this class of enzymes, with the PDB accession code .

References

 
 
 

EC 2.8.1
Enzymes of known structure